John M. "Brooms" Abramovic Jr. (February 9, 1919 – June 9, 2000) was an American professional basketball player. He played in the Basketball Association of America (BAA) for the Pittsburgh Ironmen, St. Louis Bombers and Baltimore Bullets.

Early life and college career 
Abramovic grew up in Etna, Pennsylvania, and graduated from high school in 1937. He worked in his family's plant manufacturing brooms for two years. Abramovic was offered a scholarship through his high school coach to attend Salem College (now Salem University) in Salem, West Virginia, where he played from 1939 to 1943. Abramovic's 2,170 points made him the first college basketball player to score more than 2,000 points in a career.

Abramovic spent three years in the United States Navy during World War II.

Professional career 
Abramovic returned to Pennsylvania in 1946 to play for the Pittsburgh Ironmen of the newly formed Basketball Association of America (BAA). Abramovic averaged 11.2 points per game during his only season with the team before it folded. He played professionally for one more season and then retired from basketball to join the family broom and mop business in Etna. Abramovic officiated prep and college sports for over 25 years.

Legacy 
Abramovic was inducted into the West Virginia Sportswriters Hall of Fame in 1971, and the Salem University Athletic Hall of Fame in 1984.

BAA career statistics

Regular season

References

External links 
 

1919 births
2000 deaths
All-American college men's basketball players
American men's basketball players
American people of Croatian descent
Baltimore Bullets (1944–1954) players
Basketball players from Pennsylvania
People from Etna, Pennsylvania
Pittsburgh Ironmen players
Salem Tigers men's basketball players
Small forwards
St. Louis Bombers (NBA) players
Syracuse Nationals players
United States Navy personnel of World War II